Rachmastrivka is a Hasidic dynasty named after the town of Rotmistrivka, Ukraine. It is an offshoot of the Chernobyl dynasty dating back to the 19th century.

The founder of the dynasty, Rebbe Yochanan Twersky (1816-1895), was the youngest son of Rebbe Mordechai Twersky, the Maggid of Chernobyl. He was the son-in-law of Rabbi Pinchos of Kalk. He died on 4 Nisan 5655 (1895) in Rachmastrivka.

There are currently two rebbes, whose courts are located in Borough Park, Brooklyn, New York and in Jerusalem. Los Angeles is also home to a significant Rachmastrivka community. The rebbe in Jerusalem is a nephew of the one in Borough Park, since the previous rebbe in Israel died in 2004, and his son took over his mantle of leadership in Israel.

Rachmastrivka is one of the larger Hasidic groups. The two rebbes have a close relationship with no tension between them. This has continued into the next generation; the new rebbe in Jerusalem visited New York on September 14, 2006 and stayed with his uncle.

Lineage of the Rachmastrivka dynasty
Rebbe Yochanan Twersky, founder of the Rachmastrivka dynasty, was the youngest son of the Chernobler Maggid, Rebbe Mordechai Twersky. Rebbe Mordechai's father, Rebbe Menachem Nachum Twersky of Chernobyl (author of Meor Einayim), was a disciple of the Baal Shem Tov, the founder of Hasidism.

Rebbe Yochanan Twersky of Rachmastrivka (1816-1895) – son of the Magid of Chernobyl.
Rebbe Duvid Twersky of Zlatipoli (died 1915) – son of the Rebbe Yochanan of Rachmastrivka.
Rebbe Mordchai Yoseph of Zlatipoli (died 1939) – only son of the Rebbe Duvid Twersky of Zlatipoli.
Rebbe Tzvi Aryeh of Zlatipoli - son of the Rebbe Mordchai Yoseph of Zlatipoli.
Rabbi Pinchos Biberfeld (1915-1999) - son-in-law of Rebbe Tsvi Arye
Rebbe Mordechai of Rachmastrivka (died 1921, Jerusalem)
Rebbe Menachem Nochum Twersky of Rachmastrivka (died 1937) - son of Rebbe Yochanan.
 Rebbe Yaakov Yosef Twersky of Stanislav (Very well respected Hassidic Rebbe in Vienna, and a part of a group of Zionist Hassidic Rebbes - Was close to Theodor Herzl ) 
Rebbe Avrohom Dov - son of Rebbe Menachem Nochum
Rebbe Duvid (David) Twersky of Rachmastrivka (1872-1950) - son of Rebbe Menachem Nochum.
Rebbe Yochanan Twersky (1903-1982) of Rachmastrivka – son of Rebbe Duvid.
Rebbe Chai Yitzchok  (Isaac) Twersky of Rachmastrivka-Boro Park – present Rachmastrivka Rebbe of Boro Park ( born 1931)- son of Rebbe Yochanan - son-in-law of Rebbe Yaakov Yosef Twersky (1899-1968) of Skver.
Rebbe Yisroel Mordechai (Israel Mordecai) Twersky (1929-2004) of Rachmastrivka-Yerushalayim – previous Rachmastrivka Rebbe of Jerusalem - son of Rebbe Yochanan.
Rebbe Duvid (David) Twersky of Rachmastrivka-Yerushalayim – present Rachmastrivka Rebbe of Jerusalem - eldest son of Rebbe Yisroel Mordechai 
Rabbi Nachman Yosef Twersky –  second son of Rebbe Yisroel Mordechai (lives in Crown Heights and is a Lubavitcher chasid, and teaches in the chabad yeshivah Oholei Torah).

See also
Chernobyl (Hasidic dynasty)

References

Hasidic dynasties headquartered in Jerusalem
Rachmastrivka (Hasidic dynasty)